Johannes Pretorius (born 5 September 1956) is a South African cricketer. He played in one first-class match for Boland in 1983/84.

See also
 List of Boland representative cricketers

References

External links
 

1956 births
Living people
South African cricketers
Boland cricketers
Cricketers from Cape Town